Pötzschau is a village and a former municipality in Saxony, Germany. Since 2015, it is part of the town Rötha. It consists of the smaller parts Großpötzschau, Kleinpötzschau and Dahlitzsch. Pötzschau is south-east of Leipzig in the valley of the creek Gösel.

History 

The first mentioning was as Beschowe in 1206, the distinction were added, "Groß" (great) in 1514, and "Klein" (small) in 1497. Dahlitzsch was first mentioned as Talzschicz in 1469. Formerly an independent municipality, it was merged into the municipality Espenhain in 1995. Espenhain was merged into the town Rötha in 2015.

References

Literature 
 Thomas Nabert, Andreas Berkner, Sigrun Kabisch (ed.): Im Pleiße- und Göselland : zwischen Markkleeberg, Rötha und Kitzscher, ProLeipzig, Leipzig 1999, 
 

Leipzig (district)
Former municipalities in Saxony